Iran competed at the 2016 Winter Youth Olympics in Lillehammer, Norway from 12 to 21 February 2016.

Alpine skiing

Boy

Girl

See also
Iran at the 2016 Summer Olympics

References

2016 in Iranian sport
Nations at the 2016 Winter Youth Olympics
Iran at the Youth Olympics